Doc or, less commonly, The Doc is the nickname of:

American Old West 
  Doc Holliday (1851–1887), American gunfighter, gambler and dentist
  William Frank Carver (1851–1927), American sharpshooter and Wild West show producer
  Doc Scurlock (1849–1929), American cowboy and gunfighter

Sports
 Doc Adams (1814–1899), American baseball player and executive
 Doc Adkins (1872–1934), American baseball player
 Doc Alexander (1897–1975), American NFL football player and coach
 Doc Amole (1878–1912), American baseball player
 Doc Ayers (1891–1968), American baseball player
 Darrel Baldock (1938–2011), Australian rules football player and coach and politician nicknamed "The Doc"
 Doc Baker (died c. early 1920s), African-American football player
 Doc Bass (1898–1970), American baseball player
 Doc Bennett (1891–1974), American baseball player and manager
 Doc Blanchard (1924–2009), American football player and fighter pilot
 Doc Casey (1870–1936), American Major League Baseball player and manager
 Matthew Clarke (Australian footballer) (born 1973), retired
 Doc Cook (baseball) (1886–1973), American Major League Baseball player
 L. J. Cooke (1868–1943), American college men's basketball coach
 Doc Crandall (1887–1951), American Major League Baseball player, the first used consistently as a relief pitcher
 Donald Dann (1949–2005), Australian Paralympic athlete
 Seán Doherty (Gaelic footballer) (born 1947), Irish former Gaelic football manager and player
 Ed Dougherty (born 1947), American golfer
 Doc Edwards (born 1936), American Major League Baseball player
 Mike Emrick (born 1946), American hockey broadcaster
 Doc Gautreau (1901–1970), American Major League Baseball player and manager
 Doc Gessler (1880–1924), American Major League Baseball player
 Dwight Gooden (born 1964), American Major League Baseball pitcher
 Doctor Greenwood (1860–1951), English footballer
 Roy Halladay (1977–2017), American Major League Baseball pitcher
 Dick Hoblitzell (1888–1962), American Major League Baseball player
 Arthur Irwin (1858–1921), Canadian-American Major League Baseball player and manager
 Jack Kearns (1882–1963), American boxing manager, most notably for Jack Dempsey
 Allan Kwartler (1917–1998), American sabre and foil fencer, Pan American Games and Maccabiah Games champion
 Doc Lawson (born 1958), American soccer player
 Doc MacKenzie (1906–1936), American race car driver
 Doc McJames (1874–1901), American baseball player and physician
 Walter Meanwell (1884–1953), college men's basketball coach
 Doc Medich (born 1948), American baseball player
 Cary Middlecoff (1921–1998), American golfer and dentist
 Donald Minnegan (1902–2002), former coach and athletic director at Towson University
 Gil Morgan (born 1946), American golfer
 Harold Nicholls (1897–1977), New Zealand rugby football player
 Danell Nicholson (born 1967), American former boxer
 Donncha O'Callaghan (born 1979), Irish rugby union footballer
 Derek Pace (1932–1989), English footballer
 Doc Powers (1870–1909), American Major League Baseball player and physician
 Doc Prothro (1893–1971), American Major League Baseball player and manager and dentist
 Doc Redman (born 1997), American golfer
 Ross Reynolds (1887–1970), American Major League Baseball pitcher
 Doc Rivers (born 1961), American National Basketball Association player and coach
 Johnny Rutherford (baseball) (born 1925), Canadian former Major League Baseball pitcher
 Harry Sage (1864–1947), American Major League Baseball player
 Homer Smoot (1878–1928), American Major League Baseball player
 Gary Wiggins (1952–2008), Australian cyclist nicknamed "The Doc"
 Doc Wise (born 1967), American football player

Arts and entertainment 
 Doc Bagby, American musician
 Doc Brown (rapper) (born 1980), British rapper and comedian
 Doc Cheatham (1905–1997), American jazz trumpeter, singer and bandleader
 George Hager (1885–?), American illustrator and newspaper editorial cartoonist
 Doc Hammer, American musician and writer of The Venture Bros
 Owen Smith, Producer at game development company Uncommon Chocolate 
 Harold L. Humes (1926–1992), American writer and activist
 Charles Kuhn (1892–1989), American cartoonist
 Doc Neeson (1947–2014), Irish-born Australian rock singer
 Doc Pomus (1925–1991), American blues singer and songwriter
 David G. Robinson (theatre pioneer), 19th century theatrical pioneer in Northern California
 Doc Searls (born 1947), American journalist, author and blogger
 Doc Severinsen (born 1927), American trumpeter and bandleader
 Doc Shaw (born 1992), American actor, singer and rapper
 Neil Simon (1927–2018), American playwright and screenwriter
 E. E. Smith (1890–1965), American science fiction writer
Danny Torrance, a fictional character in Stephen King's The Shining
 Doc Watson (born 1923), American musician and songwriter

Military 
 John Bahnsen (born 1934), retired US Army brigadier general
 Donald E. Ballard (born 1945), American retired colonel and Medal of Honor recipient
 John Bradley (United States Navy) (1923–1994), US Navy corpsman who participated in the raising of the flag on Iwo Jima
 Donald M. Carpenter (1894–1940), early US Navy aviator
 Ivan Dougherty (1907–1998), Australian Army major general
 Ralph Eaton (1898–1986), US Army brigadier general
 Robert H. Foglesong (born 1945), retired US Air Force general
 Robert R. Ingram (born 1945), retired US Navy sailor and recipient of the Medal of Honor
 Charles R. Jennison (1834–1888), American Civil War colonel and anti-slavery activist
 Rick Jolly (born 1946), former Royal Navy surgeon-captain nicknamed "The Doc"
 Wheeler Bryson Lipes (1920–2005), US Navy pharmacist's mate who performed the first major surgery aboard a submarine
 Harold Anthony Oaks (1896–1968), Canadian World War I flying ace
 Lewis Powell (conspirator) (1844–1865), Confederate soldier hanged for his part in the Abraham Lincoln assassination plot
 Alfred V. Rascon (born 1945), US Army retired lieutenant colonel and Medal of Honor recipient
 William P. Sanders (1833–1863), Union Army officer during the American Civil War

Politicians and government officials 
 A. A. Ames (1842–1911), American politician
 David O. Cooke (1920–2002), American government administrator
 Charles Edgar Edgett (1883–1947), Canadian police chief and anti-communist
 H. V. Evatt (1894–1965), Australian politician
 Doc Hastings (1941-), American politician
 Robert Newell (politician) (1807–1869), American politician, fur trapper and frontier doctor
 Dennis O'Keefe (politician), former mayor of St. John's, Newfoundland and Labrador, Canada

Other 
 Arthur Barker (1899–1939), American criminal, son of Ma Barker and a member of the Barker-Karpis gang
 John W. A. "Doc" Buyers (1928–2006), American business executive
 Ruben Cavazos (born 1957), American criminal, former International President of the Mongols Motorcycle Club
 Maurice Ewing (1906–1974), American geophysicist and oceanographer
 Michael Keiner (born 1959), German poker player and plastic surgeon nicknamed "The Doc"
 Maynard Jack Ramsay (1914–2005), American entomologist
 George M. Willing (1829–1874), American physician, prospector, and political lobbyist

See also 
 
 
 Dock (given name)
 François Duvalier (1907–1971), President of Haiti nicknamed "Papa Doc"
 Jean-Claude Duvalier (1951–2014), President of Haiti nicknamed "Baby Doc", son of François Duvalier
 Doctor (disambiguation)

Lists of people by nickname